Ward Lake, also known as Bill Evers Reservoir, is a 255-acre body of water in Manatee County, Florida, in the United States. It provides most of the water for the city of Bradenton and is a water feature in the Manatee River watershed.

Overview
Its inflow and outflow is the Braden River. The lake has had problems with nutrient loading and elevated concentrations of dissolved copper. Ward Lake /Bill Evers Reservoir was built in the late 1930s and expanded in 1985.

See also
Upper Manatee River Canoe Trail

References

Lakes of Manatee County, Florida
Reservoirs in Florida
1930s establishments in Florida